Bence Tóth may refer to:

 Bence Tóth (footballer, born 1989), Hungarian footballer
 Bence Tóth (footballer, born 1998), Hungarian footballer